Barber's Tales (Filipino: Mga Kuwentong Barbero) is a 2013 Filipino drama film by Jun Robles Lana. The film stars Eugene Domingo as Marilou, a widow who is forced to take her late husband's job as community barber during the end of Marcos era. The film is the follow up to Lana's film Bwakaw and second of a trilogy focused on the small-town life in the Philippines. The film had its world premiere and competed at the 2013 Tokyo International Film Festival, where it won the Best Actress Award for Eugene Domingo's performance.

The film had its commercial release in the Philippines on August 13, 2014.

Synopsis
Barber's Tales is set in the rural town in the Philippines during the Marcos dictatorship, and tells the story of newly widowed Marilou (Eugene Domingo) who inherits the town's only barbershop from her husband- a business that has been passed down by generations of men in her husband's family. With no other means of support, she musters the courage to run the barbershop. But as to be expected, she fails to attract any customers. But a touching act of kindness she extended to Rosa, a prostitute who works in the town brothel, leads to an unexpected opportunity. Rosa, who now considers Marilou a friend, urges her prostitute friends to pressure their male clientele into patronizing Marilou's barbershop. The men have no choice but to grudgingly oblige out of fear that Rosa will expose their infidelity to their wives.

Cast
Eugene Domingo as Marilou
Daniel Fernando as Jose
Eddie Garcia as Father Arturo
Sue Prado as Rosa
Shamaine Buencamino as Tess
Nicco Manalo as Edmond
Gladys Reyes as Susan
Noni Buencamino as Mayor Alfredo Bartolome
Iza Calzado as Cecilia
Nora Aunor as guerilla leader (cameo appearance)

Awards and nominations
2013 Tokyo International Film Festival 
 Best Actress (Eugene Domingo)
 Nominated–Tokyo Sakura Grand Prix
2014 Asian Film Awards
 Nominated–Best Actress (Eugene Domingo)
2014 Udine Far East Film Festival
 3rd Place - Audience Award

References

External links
 

2013 films
2013 drama films
Philippine New Wave
Philippine drama films
Films directed by Jun Robles Lana